Lewis Welch (January 1814November 15, 1878) was a Michigan politician.

Early life
Welch was born in January 1814 in New York.

Career
Welch served as supervisor of Exeter Township, Michigan from 1845 to 1849. On November 4, 1856, Welch was elected to the Michigan Senate where he represented the 9th district from January 7, 1857 to December 31, 1860.

Personal life
On January 3, 1836, Welch married Lois Katherine Palmer. Together, they had four children. Welch was Methodist Episcopal.

Death
Welch died in Exeter Township on November 15, 1878 due to brain swelling. At the time of his death, he had lived in Exeter Township for over 40 years. He was interred at McIntyre Cemetery in Monroe, Michigan on November 17, 1878.

References

1814 births
1878 deaths
Methodists from Michigan
Burials in Michigan
People from New York (state)
People from Monroe County, Michigan
Michigan state senators
19th-century American politicians